Placentinus (died 1192) was an Italian jurist and glossator. Originally from Piacenza, he taught at the University of Bologna. From there he founded the law school of the University of Montpellier, in 1160.

References

External links
Works of Placentinus at ParalipomenaIuris

1192 deaths
Year of birth unknown
12th-century Italian jurists